Whitecone is a census-designated place in Navajo County, in the U.S. state of Arizona. The population was 817 at the 2010 census.

Demographics

As of the census of 2010, there were 817 people, 225 households, and 184 families living in the CDP. The racial makeup of the CDP was 96.8% Native American, 0.4% White, 0.4% Asian, 0.4% Pacific Islander, 0.1% from other races, and 2.0% from two or more races. 3.2% of the population were Hispanic or Latino of any race.

There were 225 households, out of which 36% had children under the age of 18 living with them, 46.2% were married couples living together, 25.3% had a female householder with no husband present, and 18.2% were non-families. 17.8% of all households were made up of individuals, and 5.8% had someone living alone who was 65 years of age or older.  The average household size was 3.36 and the average family size was 4.10.

Education
A portion is in the Cedar Unified School District and a portion is in the Holbrook Unified School District. The latter portion is zoned to Holbrook High School.

Notable people
Harrison Begay, Navajo painter, was born in Whitecone.
Sherwin Bitsui, Navajo writer, is from Whitecone.

References

Census-designated places in Navajo County, Arizona
Census-designated places in Arizona